The Copley Medal is the most prestigious award of the Royal Society, conferred "for sustained, outstanding achievements in any field of science". It alternates between the physical sciences or mathematics and the biological sciences. Given annually, the medal is the oldest Royal Society medal awarded and the oldest surviving scientific award in the world, having first been given in 1731 to Stephen Gray, for "his new Electrical Experiments: – as an encouragement to him for the readiness he has always shown in obliging the Society with his discoveries and improvements in this part of Natural Knowledge". The medal in its current format is made of silver-gilt and awarded with a £25,000 prize.

The Copley Medal is arguably the highest British award for scientific achievement, and has been included among the most distinguished international scientific awards. It is awarded to "senior scientists" irrespective of nationality, and nominations are considered over three nomination cycles. Since 2022, scientific teams or research groups are collectively eligible to receive the medal; that year, the research team which developed the Oxford–AstraZeneca COVID-19 vaccine became the first such collective recipient. John Theophilus Desaguliers has won the medal the most often, winning three times, in 1734, 1736 and 1741. In 1976, Dorothy Hodgkin became the first female recipient; Jocelyn Bell Burnell, in 2021, became the second.



History 
In 1709, Sir Godfrey Copley, the MP for Thirsk, bequeathed Abraham Hill and Hans Sloane £100 (roughly equivalent to £ in ) to be held in trust for the Royal Society "for improving natural knowledge to be laid out in experiments or otherwise for the benefit thereof as they shall direct and appoint". After the legacy had been received the following year, the interest of £5 was duly used to provide recurring grants for experimental work to researchers associated with the Royal Society, provided they registered their research within a stipulated period and demonstrated their experiments at an annual meeting. In 1726, following a proposal by Sloane, the grants were extended to "strangers" unaffiliated with the Society to encourage "new and useful experiments," though it was only five years later that Stephen Gray became the first such recipient. Prior to Gray, John Theophilus Desaguliers was apparently the only recipient of the grant, but had not always conducted the required annual demonstration.

In November 1736, Martin Folkes, then vice-president of the Society, suggested the Copley grant be converted to "a medal or other honorary prize to be bestowed on the person whose experiment should be best approved...a laudable emulation might be excited among men of genius to try their invention, who in all probability may never be moved for the sake of lucre". On 7 December 1736, the Council of the Royal Society agreed to Folkes' proposal, passing a resolution that the annual Copley grant of five pounds (roughly equivalent to £ in ) be converted to a gold medal "of the same Value, with the Arms of the Society impress’d on it," to be gifted "for the best Experiment produced within the Year, and bestowed in such a manner as to avoid any Envy or Disgust in Rivalship". John Belchier was the first to receive the new award in 1737; due to delays in approving a medal design, however, the medal, designed and struck by John Sigismund Tanner of the Royal Mint, was only presented to Belchier in 1742. Gray and Desaguliers received their medals retrospectively.

Into the early 19th century, medal recipients were selected by the President of the Royal Society, though not always on the basis of publications and experimental demonstrations; political and social connections were also key considerations, along with service in the general interests of the Society. During the long presidency of Joseph Banks, the medal was frequently awarded to recipients whose researches were of a practical or technical nature, involving improvements to scientific equipment or instrument design. In 1831, new regulations adopted by the Royal Society Council made the medal an annual award, dropped the requirement for conducting the qualifying research within a certain period and officially opened it to scientists from any nation; although the medal had previously been awarded to foreign scientists including Alessandro Volta, the majority of recipients had been British subjects. A second donation of £1666 13s. 4d. (roughly equivalent to £ in ) was made by Sir Joseph William Copley in 1881, and the interest from that amount is used to pay for the medal.

Prestige of the medal
By the 1840s, the Copley Medal had achieved international prestige; in 1850, George Airy noted the distinction of the medal was that it was "offered to the competition of the world." The Copley medal has been characterised as a predecessor to the Nobel Prize. Since its inception, it has been awarded to many distinguished scientists, including 52 winners of the Nobel Prize: 17 in Physics, 21 in Physiology or Medicine, and 14 in Chemistry.

Medal recipients

See also
 List of biology awards
 List of chemistry awards
 List of geology awards
 List of mathematics awards
 List of physics awards

References

External links 

 

 
1731 establishments in Great Britain
1731 in science
Awards established in 1731
Awards of the Royal Society
Biology awards
Physics awards
Silver-gilt objects